Northport is the name of several places in the U.S. state of Wisconsin:

Northport, Door County, Wisconsin
Northport, Waupaca County, Wisconsin